Briparo was a locality in the Remesiana region, present Bela Palanka, Serbia.

References

Former populated places in the Balkans